Stumpers! is a game show hosted by Allen Ludden that aired on NBC from October 4 to December 31, 1976. Lin Bolen, former head of NBC Daytime Programming, developed the show. Bill Armstrong was the program's regular announcer, with Charlie O'Donnell filling in for several episodes. The show featured game play similar to Password, with two teams (consisting of one celebrity and one contestant) attempting to guess the subject of puzzles based on clues provided by their opponents.

The series premiered and ended on the same dates as 50 Grand Slam, which immediately followed Stumpers! on the NBC schedule and was hosted by Tom Kennedy.

Main game

The object of the game was to solve a "stumper", which was a puzzle consisting of three clues to a person, place, or thing. In round one, each player on a team gave clues to their opposing counterpart (contestant gave clues to contestant, celebrity to celebrity). The contestant or celebrity was shown the three clue words (but not the answer to the stumper) and had to choose the one they thought would be least likely to help their opponent guess the stumper.

After each clue was given, the opposing player would have five seconds to provide as many guesses as they could. If the opposing player guessed the subject correctly, their team was awarded points as based on the number of clues already provided:

If the opposing player was unable to guess the stumper after being supplied with all three clues, the clue-giving team would earn 15 points for a correct guess in round one, 30 points in round two.  If neither team was unable to guess the stumper, no points were awarded and play continued with the next stumper.

Two stumpers were played per team member, for a total of four stumpers per round.

Round two, the "Double-Up Round," consisted of two more stumpers worth double the points from round one.  Both team members could provide a guess during round two, despite which opponent supplied the clues.

The team that was ahead at the end of round two won the game and a chance at $10,000 in the Super Stumpers round. The most a team could score in total was 120 points.

In the event of a tie, Ludden would provide the clues, one at a time, and the teams would buzz in to guess.  The first to give the right answer won the game, while a wrong guess gave the opposing team a chance to guess.  If neither team answered correctly after the third clue, another tie-breaker stumper was played.

Bonus round ("Super Stumpers")
In Super Stumpers, the object for the contestant was to correctly guess the subject of stumpers with the celebrity giving clues. This time, the idea was to give clues that would be more helpful in guessing the subject instead of being ones that would be less helpful. The celebrity was shown three clue words and one at a time would relay them to the contestant until the contestant correctly solved the stumper or all three words were exhausted. In order to receive another of the clue words, the contestant had to say "clue"; giving one without being asked forfeited the chance at the jackpot.

Contestants were given sixty seconds to guess ten subjects, and doing so won $10,000. If a contestant did not do so, $100 was awarded for each subject guessed.

Two complete games were played per episode. Contestants could stay on the show until they were defeated or won Super Stumpers twice.

Episode status
Due to NBC's practice of wiping, the status of the entire series is unknown. The premiere and finale exist, along with another episode from December 1976.

References

External links
 Stumpers on IMDb

NBC original programming
1970s American game shows
1976 American television series debuts
1976 American television series endings